Brayan Ramírez may refer to:

 Brayan Ramírez (cyclist) (born 1992), Colombian cyclist
 Brayan Ramírez (footballer) (born 1994), Honduran footballer